Vladimir II (died 1118) was King of Duklja (southern parts of present-day Montenegro and northwestern parts of present-day Albania) from 1103 to 1113. He was a son of prince Vladimir, the oldest son of King Mihailo I of Duklja (r. 1050–1081), and thus a nephew of King Constantine Bodin (r. 1081–1101). He married a daughter of Vukan, the Grand Prince of Serbia, thereby ending rivalries between the two polities. Vladimir had been appointed the rule of Duklja by his father-in-law Vukan, after the death of his uncle, former King Kočopar, in Zahumlje. He was poisoned in 1118 on the orders of Queen-Dowager Jaquinta, the widow of his uncle, Constantine Bodin. Jaquinta soon appointed her son, George, to the throne.

See also
 Duklja
 Vojislavljević dynasty
 Vukanović dynasty
 Grand Principality of Serbia

References

Sources 
 
 
 

Year of birth unknown
1118 deaths
12th-century Serbian people
Rulers of Duklja
Vojislavljević dynasty
Serbs of Montenegro
Murdered Serbian royalty
Deaths by poisoning